Rainbow is an unincorporated community in Lane County, Oregon, United States. It lies off Oregon Route 126, northeast of Eugene. A post office was established on July 1, 1924, and closed August 31, 1937. The post office got its name from the rainbow trout that swim in the McKenzie River.

References

External links

Unincorporated communities in Lane County, Oregon
1924 establishments in Oregon
Unincorporated communities in Oregon